Kutaisuri Versia is a newspaper published in Georgia. It is based in the city of Kutaisi.

Newspapers published in Georgia (country)
Mass media in Kutaisi
Publications with year of establishment missing